Neudorf-Weimershof is a quarter in eastern Luxembourg City, in southern Luxembourg.

, the quarter has a population of 6,451 inhabitants.

References

Quarters of Luxembourg City